Goldfinger is the debut studio album by punk rock band Goldfinger, released on Mojo Records in February 1996 and produced by Mojo founder Jay Rifkin. The album was a hit on college radio. The single "Here in Your Bedroom" was a top 5 rock hit in the U.S. in the summer of 1996, and also reached #47 on the Billboard Hot 100 Airplay chart, making it their highest charting single ever. The album was certified Gold in Canada (50,000 copies) in 2002. It is the only album by the band not to be produced by frontman John Feldmann in any capacity.

Horns on the album are provided by members of other Southern California ska and ska punk bands, including trombonist Dan Regan and trumpeter Scott Klopfenstein of Reel Big Fish and saxophonist Efren Santana of Hepcat. Paul Hampton of The Skeletones provides keyboards on the album and is featured in the video for "Here In Your Bedroom". The cover for the album was drawn by Alan Forbes. It depicts a "big sex god alien chasing this little man, '50s style".

Although Goldfinger is a well-known album among the ska punk community, Feldmann doesn't consider it a work of that genre.

Music and song information 
Goldfinger was recorded in Hans Zimmer studio by the time he was recording The Lion King II: Simba's Pride. In the album's 20th anniversary, Feldmann commented on its music:

The opening track "Mind's Eye" was the first song Feldmann wrote for Goldfinger. Commenting on the feedback heard in the very first seconds of the song, he said: "We recorded that album on tape. It was all super experimental—'Well what if we have the feedback going, we hit record and start playing so the tape starts with nothing.'". "Anything" was written by a 17-year-old Feldmann.

Track listing
All songs written by John Feldmann, except where noted.

Personnel
John Feldmann – vocals, guitar
Charlie Paulson – guitar, vocals
Dangerous Darrin Pfeiffer – drums, vocals
Simon Williams – bass, vocals

References

1996 debut albums
Goldfinger (band) albums
Mojo Records albums